René Zagger (born 1 June 1973) is an English actor, known for playing PC Nick Klein in The Bill from 1999 to 2004 and as the voice of Emet-Selch in Final Fantasy XIV from the Stormblood expansion onward. He has also made several guest appearances in Casualty, Doctors and Wycliffe.

Background 
Zagger was born in Leytonstone, London. His father is of Russian-Polish ancestry and his mother is of Spanish-Portuguese ancestry. Zagger was raised a practising Jew by his parents but now considers himself to be more traditionalist. While attending Davenant Foundation School his interest in acting began affecting his attendance, so the headmaster suggested that he move to an acting school. He left his school and enrolled at Italia Conti Academy of Performing Arts.

Career 
Zagger's first professional acting role was portraying a young Marti Pellow in the Wet Wet Wet music video I Remember. Other roles soon followed; from 1990–1991, Zagger played Mike Bentley in the children's TV drama Grange Hill, and later in 1991 he played the role of "Razors" in the Granada Television series Up the Garden Path. He also had several guest roles in Minder, Casualty, Wycliffe, Dangerous Lady and The Bill.

In 1999, Zagger auditioned for the role of Dale Smith in The Bill, but the role went to his best friend Alex Walkinshaw and the character of PC Nick Klein was created for him. Zagger remained in the role for five years. Zagger left the series and took the role of Antipholus of Syracuse in the Stafford festival's production of Shakespeare's The Comedy of Errors.

In 2006 Rene starred in the Dream Team mini-series Dream Team 80's as striker Johnny Fletcher, who was the father to Harchester legend Karl Fletcher.

In 2006, Zagger filmed the historical drama, O Jerusalem, and vampire-horror film Night Junkies with Giles Alderson and Katia Winter. O Jerusalem was shown in France on 18 October 2006 and Night Junkies was released in December.

In 2006, he appeared in the BBC series Robin Hood in the episode "A Thing or Two About Loyalty" as Lambert.

In 2007 Zagger played the Israeli nuclear technician Mordechai Vanunu, who leaked the existence of the Israeli secret Nuclear Weapons plant at Dimona in 1986 and was subsequently kidnapped by Mossad in the BBC Nuclear Secrets episode "Vanunu and the Bomb".

In June 2007, he appeared in the Doctor Who in the episode "Utopia" as Padra.

In July 2007, Zagger appeared as Herod in the second series of BBC/HBO TV series, Rome.

The autumn of 2008 saw Zagger guest star in two major BBC1 crime series; he played an alcoholic ex-army Tottenham Hotspur supporter in New Tricks, and an Australian, Danny, in Silent Witness.

In January 2008, he made an appearance as Colt Winchester (Colin from Winchester) in the 5th episode of series three of MIHigh called "Dark Star".

In January 2010, he made an appearance as Farris Andreou in the second episode in the second series of Law and Order UK called "Hidden".

In June 2011, he made an appearance in the TV sitcom, My Family.

From November 2011 to April 2012, he starred in Comedy of Errors alongside Lenny Henry at the National Theatre in Southbank, London.

In June 2012, he made an appearance, alongside Luke Goss, as Cesar in the feature film Interview with a Hitman, directed by Perry Bhandal.

In March 2013, he performed in the stage play Hope, written and directed by Scot Williams and co-starred with Samantha Womack and Mark Womack. The play ran at the Royal Court Theatre, Liverpool. In 2014, he joined the cast of the new musical Made in Dagenham, originating the role of Stan.

Beginning in 2018, he performed voice work for the MMORPG Final Fantasy XIV as Solus zos Galvus, eventually known as the antagonist Emet-Selch in the video game's Shadowbringers expansion, as well as its follow up Endwalker

He appeared in Emmerdale in 2019 as Casino Mob boss Terry, later appearing in the BBC soap opera Doctors as Ross Dempster in May 2022.

References

External links 
 

1973 births
English male television actors
Living people
People from Leytonstone
English people of Spanish descent
English people of Portuguese descent
English people of Russian descent
British people of Polish descent
Alumni of the Italia Conti Academy of Theatre Arts